Freeway is an action video game written by David Crane for the Atari 2600 and published by Activision in 1981.

One or two players control chickens who can be made to run across a ten lane highway filled with traffic in an effort to "get to the other side". Every time a chicken gets across a point is earned for that player. If hit by a car, a chicken is forced back either slightly, or pushed back to the bottom of the screen, depending on what difficulty the switch is set to. The winner is the player who has scored the most points in the time allotted.

Development
David Crane got the idea from the SCES in Chicago, where a man tried to cross the street. This was mentioned in the first issue of Electronic Games magazine.

Patch
If a player scored 20 or more points on either Road 3 or Road 7 and sent in a photograph of the television screen, Activision would send the player a cloth "Save The Chicken Foundation" patch featuring the Activision logo and the stylized "running chicken" image from the game package.

Reception

Freeway received an Honorable Mention for "Most Innovative Game" in 1982 at the Third Annual Arkie Awards.

See also

List of Atari 2600 games
List of Activision games: 1980–1999
Frogger, another 1981 video game with an animal crossing a road concept

References

External links
Freeway at Atari Mania

1981 video games
Action video games
Activision games
Atari 2600 games
Atari 2600-only games
Fictional chickens
Multiplayer video games
Video games about birds
Video games developed in the United States